There are 3,943 mosques in Thailand as of March 2018. The Southern region has the most share in the kingdom with 3,340 mosques or roughly 85% of all mosques. In term of provinces; Pattani Province has the biggest share at 707 mosques, following by Narathiwat Province at 666 mosques, and Yala Province at 509 mosques, whilst the capital city, Bangkok, has 183 mosques.

The lists below are some notable mosques in Thailand by regions:

Bangkok

Central

Northern

Northeastern

Southern

See also
 Islam in Thailand
 Lists of mosques

References

Thailand
 
Mosques